Natalie A. Shepard was a state legislator in Maine. She lived in Stonington, Maine and represented Hancock County, Maine in 1959 and 1961. She was a Republican.

She won a special election in 1959 after the death of her husband Myron Shepard. She defeated Girard V. Condon of Brooksville 474 votes to 240. Her deceased husband was serving in his second term.

She was born Natalie Alma Libby. She had a son and a daughter Jean Ann Shepard.

References

Year of birth missing (living people)
Living people
Maine Republicans
People from Stonington, Maine
Women state legislators in Maine
20th-century American women politicians
20th-century American politicians
Spouses of Maine politicians